The Congolese Movement for Democracy and Integral Development (MCDDI) is a liberal political party in the Republic of the Congo, led by Bernard Kolélas until his death in 2009. His son, Guy Brice Parfait Kolélas, has led the party since then until his death in 2021. The MCDDI is an observer party of Liberal International.

History
The party was co-founded by Kolélas and renowned novelist and writer Sony Lab'ou Tansi; its statutes were deposited at the Ministry of the Interior on 3 August 1989. Kolélas was the MCDDI's candidate in the August 1992 presidential election, in which he placed second behind Pascal Lissouba of the Pan-African Union for Social Democracy (UPADS).

Didier Sengha, an MCDDI deputy in the National Assembly, left the MCDDI in April 1995 and founded a new party, the Party of Unity, Work and Progress (PUTP), in May 1995. The new party said that the MCDDI had abandoned its principles and that Kolélas controlled the MCDDI in an autocratic manner; Kolélas, in turn, denounced Sengha as a criminal, saying that he was guilty of embezzlement and misappropriating funds.

The MCDDI and the Congolese Labour Party (PCT) of President Denis Sassou Nguesso signed an agreement on April 24, 2007 to form an alliance for the 2007 parliamentary election as well as subsequent local, senatorial, and presidential elections.  In the parliamentary election, held on June 24 and August 5, 2007, the party won 11 out of 137 seats in the National Assembly.

At the MCDDI's First Convention, held in Brazzaville on 24–25 May 2008, Guy Brice Parfait Kolélas, a son of Bernard Kolélas, was designated as the Coordinator of the MCDDI National Executive Bureau and National Secretary for Development Strategies. In that capacity, he was considered the second ranking member of the party, after his father. However, his father was by that point an elderly man in apparently declining health (although present, he failed to even give the closing speech at the convention), and thus the son was effectively being designated as the MCDDI's de facto leader. It was also considered evident that he was being positioned to ultimately succeed his father.

Bernard Kolélas died at the age of 76 on 13 November 2009. The MCDDI Executive Bureau met on 23 January 2010 and decided that Guy Brice Parfait Kolélas would serve as Interim President of the MCDDI, in addition to his role as Coordinator of the Executive Bureau, until a party congress could be held. In its previous 20 years of existence under Bernard Kolélas, the MCDDI had never held a congress.

Speaking to MCDDI supporters in June 2014, Kolélas sharply criticized the party's ally, the PCT, for failing to fulfill its promises. He complained that the MCDDI had been promised a variety of posts—"ambassadors, prefects, mayors and many other things"—but that the PCT had not followed through. Nevertheless, he said that he would not terminate the alliance, as it was "signed on the blood of our ancestors".

Guy Brice Parfait Kolélas died on 22 March 2021, at the age of 61, after contracting COVID-19.

References

External links 
  

Political parties in the Republic of the Congo
Political parties established in 1989
1989 establishments in the Republic of the Congo
Liberal parties in Africa